Jamaat Jund al-Qawqaz, originally formed as Ahrar al-Sharkas (Arabic: كتيبة أحرار ألشركس, The Free Circassian Battalion), was an armed group based in the Quneitra Governorate of  Syria with some fighters in the Latakia Governorate. The group was made up of ethnic Circassians from Beer Ajam. The group came to prominence during the Quneitra Governorate clashes (2012–14).

History

The group was founded by a local from Beer Ajam of Circassian descent who goes by the nom de guerre Abu Hatab al-Sharkassy who has expressed support for the Caucasus Emirate. In 2014 he declared allegiance to Ajnad al-Kavkaz, thus making Ahrar al-Sharkas part of it and moved some fighters to the Latakia Governorate to be closer to the central core of Ajnad al-Kavkaz. After their declaration of allegiance to Ajnad Al-Kavkaz, Ajnad Al-Kavkaz officially recognized itself as active in the Quneitra Governorate. The group chose to remain neutral in the conflict between ISIL and other rebel groups.

References

Quneitra Governorate in the Syrian civil war